Caçapava is a municipality in the state of São Paulo in Brazil.  It is part of the Metropolitan Region of Vale do Paraíba e Litoral Norte.
Is between São José dos Campos 24 km and Taubaté 19 km.  
The distance from Caçapava to São Paulo is 109 km and from Rio de Janeiro 263 km.

Caçapava has a military unit known as 12ª Brigada de Infantaria Leve, which is part of the national army force and is constantly ready to take part in national and international missions. The city has also a reasonable industrial activity with important industries, like Nestlé and Pilkington, among others:

 ADEZAN Ind Com Embalagens e Serviços Ltda
 ALAMBIQUE do Antenor
 BLUETECH
 BRASQUÍMICA Produtos Asfalticos Ltda
 CABLETECH Ind. Com. de Condutores Elétricos
 CEA – Centro Empresarial Aeroespacial
 CEBRACE Cristal Plano Ltda  
 Cerâmica BRUMATTI Ltda
 CORTESIA Serviços de Concretagem Ltda
 CPW Brasil Ltda
 DVR Power Centers
 FERNANDO D. Perez Belart
 FLC Ind e Com Plásticos Ltda
 Graúna Usinagem
 Grupo Antolim (Intertrim, Iramec, Trimtec)
 HUBNER Sanfonas Industriais Ltda
 INTRIERI Ind Com Ltda
 IPA (TI Automotives)
 ITALSPEED Automotive
 LEAR do Brasil Ind e Com de Interiores Automotivos
 Mecânica Caçapava Ltda
 Metal G Industrial
 MWL Brasil Rodas & Eixos Ltda
 N. PADOVANI Gomes & Cia Ltda
 OLGBER Especialidades Ltda
 PENIDO Construtora
 PREMOVALE
 REPROCESSA Resíduos Industriais Ltda
 ROSENBERGER Domex
 SIMOLDES Plásticos Ind Ltda
 SOTEF Soc. Técnica de Engenharia e Fundações Ltda
 STAR RACER Brasil Ltda
 TREVES DO BRASIL
 TW Espumas Ltda
 VALEPOSTE Ind Com Artefatos Cimento Ltda
 VIAPOL Ltda
 VORANA Usinagem e Com Ltda
 WOW Ind Com Ltda
 YUSHIRO do Brasil Ind Química Ltda  

It is expected that there will be an increase in the city's industrial activity after the completion of the local airport. The airport, named Aerovale by its developers, will be privately owned and operated and will function mainly as a business and cargo hub for the region.

Sister cities 
Caçapava has only one Sister City, which is its namesake: Caçapava do Sul.

References

Municipalities in São Paulo (state)